The Movement for Active Democracy (M.A.D.) is an alternative British political party created by Andy Kirkwood in South Dorset. Party leader Kirkwood endorses the Swiss model of government in which anyone can propose a policy and force the issue to a referendum if they can gather enough support. Without having a general manifesto, that's the main goal of the party. Kirkwood also urges people to stand as independents under the slogan "vote for yourself". The Movement for Active Democracy stood candidates for the first time at the 2010 general election. Kirkwood also stood in South Dorset at the 2015 general election.

References

External links

Political parties in the United Kingdom
Political parties established in 2009
Direct democracy parties